Orune is a comune (municipality) in the Province of Nuoro in the Italian region Sardinia, located about  north of Cagliari and about  north of Nuoro.

Orune borders the following municipalities: Benetutti, Bitti, Dorgali, Lula, Nule, Nuoro.

References

Cities and towns in Sardinia